Gauntlet is a clone of Defender written by Chris Terran published in the UK by Micro Power. It was released on the Acorn Electron and BBC Micro in 1984 and on the Amstrad CPC in 1985.

Gameplay
The player controls an X15 spacecraft, protecting canisters from the hostile Reeg forces. In the game, Reeg landers search the landscape for canisters. If a lander grabs a canister and makes it to the top of the screen, it turns into a mutant. The player must shoot the enemy ship to release a grabbed canister, but if it falls too far, then it's destroyed on impact. There are also other ships such as cruisers, which when hit, unleash buzzer ships.

The player has smart bombs available which destroy all on-screen enemies. On the higher levels there are additional enemy ships such as mine layers which are capable of launching killer ships, unless the player can destroy them quickly. If the player allows destruction of all canisters, then a hoard of mutants attack and the landscape completely disappears.

References

External links
 Gamespot entry for Gauntlet (Micro Power)
 Advertisement for the game in the November 1984 issue of Electron User
 Working at Micro Power / Program Power – mentions how Chris Terran came to write Gauntlet
 Gauntlet covers, and a gallery of Micro Power and Program Power Covers

1984 video games
Amstrad CPC games
BBC Micro and Acorn Electron games
Horizontally scrolling shooters
Micro Power games
Single-player video games
Video game clones
Video games developed in the United Kingdom